Salempur (71) Lok Sabha constituency is one of the 80 Lok Sabha (parliamentary) constituencies in Deoria district of Uttar Pradesh state in northern India.

It is one of the constituencies (tehsils) in Deoria.  Its infrastructure and facility are not growing enough fast.

Assembly segments
Presently, Salempur Lok Sabha constituency comprises five Vidhan Sabha (legislative assembly) segments. These are:

Members of Parliament

Election Results

See also
 Ballia district
 List of Constituencies of the Lok Sabha

Notes

External links
Salempur lok sabha  constituency election 2019 result details

Lok Sabha constituencies in Uttar Pradesh
Deoria district
Ballia district